Burnett is an unincorporated census-designated place located in the town of Burnett, Dodge County, Wisconsin, United States. Burnett has a post office with ZIP code 53922. As of the 2010 census, its population is 256.

Images

References

Census-designated places in Dodge County, Wisconsin
Census-designated places in Wisconsin